CA Sega Joypolis Ltd. (formerly Sega Live Creation Inc.) is a subsidiary of the Chinese company CA Cultural Technology Group Limited, which controls Sega-branded Amusement Parks in Asia, such as Joypolis.

History
The company was originally founded in April 2015, as Sega Sammy Holdings' amusement park division. Ownership of the Joypolis parks transitioned to this new company except for the Okayama branch, which transitioned to the arcade focused Sega Entertainment Co., Ltd.

In July 2015, the company opened a Joypolis in Qingdao, their first venue located outside Japan & Korea.

Sega announced in 2016 that China Animations would acquire a majority stake in Sega Live Creation for 600 million yen, effective January 2017. After the ownership transitioned, China Animations renamed Sega Live Creation to CA Sega Joypolis Ltd, with Sega no-longer fully owning the parks. the 3 Orbi venues remained under the ownership of Sega, and Sega Republic was later closed down after the Sega license expired.

Current 
Tokyo Joypolis
Qingdao Joypolis
 Joypolis Sports

Former 
Orbi (Ownership transitioned to Sega)
Orbi Dubai (Ownership transitioned to Sega)
Sega Republic (Closed in June 2017)

Notes

References

External links 
 

Amusement park companies
Companies based in Tokyo
Japanese companies established in 2015
South Korean brands
Companies listed on the Korea Exchange
1967 establishments in South Korea
Companies based in Seoul
Sega Sammy Holdings